Lesley Gill is an author and a professor of anthropology at Vanderbilt University.  Her research focusses on political violence, gender, free market reforms and human rights in Latin America, especially Bolivia.  She also writes about the military training that takes place at the School of the Americas and has campaigned for its closure. She has campaigned with Witness for Peace.

Education and work
Gill has a B.A. from Macalester College (1977), and an M.A. (1978), M.Phil. (1980) and Ph.D. (1984) from Columbia University. She was a visiting fellow at the University of East Anglia from 1984 to 1985. Formerly at the American University in Washington, she moved in 2008 to Vanderbilt to chair the Department of Anthropology. Gill is one of a handful of Editors responsible for the Dialectical Anthropology academic journal.

Publications

Books
 Peasants, Entrepreneurs, and Social Change: Frontier Development in Lowland Bolivia. Boulder: Westview Press (May 20 1987). .
 Precarious Dependencies: Gender, Class, and Domestic Service in Bolivia. New York: Columbia University Press (1994). .
 Teetering on the Rim: Global Restructuring, Daily Life, and the Armed Retreat of the Bolivian State. New York: Columbia University Press (2000). .
 The School of the Americas: Military Training and Political Violence in the Americas. Durham: Duke University Press (2004). .
 A Century of Violence in a Red City: Popular Struggle, Counterinsurgency, and Human Rights in Colombia. Durham: Duke University Press (2016). .

Articles
 "Disorder and Everyday Life in Barrancabermeja." ColombiaInternacional, vol. 73 (Jan.-Jun. 2011), pp. 49-70. .
 "History, Politics, Space, Labor: On Unevenness as an Anthropological Concept," with Sharryn Kasmir. Dialectical Anthropology, vol. 40 (Apr. 22, 2016), pp. 87–102. .

References

External links
Biography at Vanderbilt University

Year of birth missing (living people)
Living people
American anthropologists
American social sciences writers
Vanderbilt University faculty
American University faculty and staff
Columbia University alumni
Macalester College alumni
Latin Americanists